Jug Band Hokum is a 2015 feature-length documentary film by Jack Norton that stars Brooklynd Turner and Anne Baggenstoss. It follows the eccentric lives of band members competing in the annual Minneapolis Battle of the Jug Bands.

The film features appearances by Garrison Keillor (of Prairie Home Companion), Bone Thugs-N-Harmony, Charlie Parr, Dom Flemons of the Carolina Chocolate Drops, and Baby Gramps among others.

References

External links 
 
Jug Band Hokum mention in No Depression Magazine

2015 films
2015 documentary films
American documentary films
Documentary films about music and musicians
2010s American films